Tony Tjamiwa (died 12 May 2001), also known as Tony Curtis, was a highly respected elder, traditional healer and storyteller of the Pitjantjatjara people.  He was a native speaker of the Pitjantjatjara language.

Biography
Tony Tjamiwa was a senior traditional owner of Uluru and Kata Tjuta and was intimately involved in the long battle for the return of them to his people. He was a board member of the Uluru-Kata Tjuta National Park. His wife was the renowned artist and carver, Pulya Taylor.

Bibliography 
 Tony Tjamiwa. 1991. "Ngaṉana Wirunya Tjunguringkula Waakarinyi: We're working well together." Habitat Australia, Vol. 19, No. 3, 3 June 1991. Australian Conservation Foundation, pp. 4–7.

Footnotes

References 
 Stanley Breeden. 1994. Uluru: Looking after Uluru-Kat Tjuta - The Anagu Way. Simon & Schuster. Australia. .

 Phillip Toyne and Daniel Vachon. 1984. Growing up the country: the Pitjantjatjara struggle for their land (1984), .
 Jennifer Isaacs. 1980. Australian Dreaming: 40,000 years of Aboriginal Dreaming. Lansdowne Press. .
 Alexis Wright for the Central Land Council (2007). Take Power Like This Old Man Here

External links
 Photo of Tjamiwa

Australian Aboriginal elders
2001 deaths
Year of birth missing